Kafr Zita (also spelled Kfar Zita, Kafr Zayta, Kfar Zeita, Keferzita or Kafr Zeita) is a town in northern Syria, administratively part of the Hama Governorate, located 30 kilometers north of Hama. Nearby localities include Kafr Nabudah and al-Habit to the northwest, Khan Shaykhun to the northeast, Mork to the east, Suran to the southeast, al-Lataminah, Halfaya and Mahardah to the south, Tremseh to the southwest and Kirnaz and Hayalin. According to the Syria Central Bureau of Statistics, Kafr Zita had a population of 17,052 in the 2004 census. It is also the center of a nahiyah ("subdistrict"), part of the Mhardeh District, that consists of seven localities with a combined population of 39,032 in 2004.

Etymology

The first word of Kafr Zita, which is Kafr, is a Syriac word for "farm" or "village". The second word 'Zita' is another Syriac word which refers to olive oil. The village is known for cultivation of olives which is still until now one of the main crops of the village. Also pistachio became popular recently regarding to its better economic revenue.

History
The ruins of a church dating to the Byzantine period in the 5th-century are located in Kafr Zita.

In the late Ottoman era between the 18th-19th centuries, the residents of Kafr Zita, which at that time was one of the largest villages in the area north of the Orontes River, were regularly in arrears for tax payment and had to obtain financial assistance.

During the period of the French Mandate in Syria, Kafr Zita, like many of the surrounding localities, was organized as a collective farming village. In 1975 the nahiyahs ("subdistricts") of Kafr Zita and Mhardeh were joined together to form the mantiqah ("district") of Mhardeh, with the latter as capital.

On 16 December 2012, during the Syrian uprising against the government of Bashar al-Assad that began in early 2011, government forces combating rebels bombed Kafr Zita, leaving three children dead, according to the Syrian Observatory for Human Rights (SOHR). On 20 December rebels claimed to have captured Kafr Zita and a string of other nearby towns during an offensive against government forces in the vicinity of Hama. In September 2013, Abu Shafiq checkpoint which is between Kafr Zita and Morek, was captured by rebels. However, on 22 September 2014, it was reported that the rebels targeted the checkpoint. By early January 2014, the town was controlled by the Islamic State of Iraq and the Levant. However, later on, ISIL was removed from the town by the rebels.

On 20 August 2019, the Syrian Observatory for Human Rights reported that the rebel and Islamic factions including jihadist group Hayat Tahrir al-Sham had withdrawn from Kafr Zita in north Hama province.

Demographics
Kafr Zita's inhabitants are predominantly Sunni Muslim Mawalis. In the early 20th-century they, along with the inhabitants of nearby Suran, were still proud of their Mawali origins. The Mawali were non-Arab Muslim nomadic tribes who dominated the desert regions of northern Syria for centuries before being forced out to the vicinity of Hama and Aleppo in the 18th century by the Annizah, a Bedouin tribal confederation from the Najd region of the Arabian Peninsula.

See also
2014 Kafr Zita chemical attack

References

Bibliography

Populated places in Mahardah District
Towns in Hama Governorate